Xuxa só Para Baixinhos 6 or Festa (also known as XSPB 6) is the twenty-ninth studio album and the twenty-second in Portuguese by singer and Brazilian presenter Xuxa, released by Som Livre on December 9, 2005, is the sixth album in the collection Só Para Baixinhos.

The album has re-recordings of the singer's greatest hits since Xou da Xuxa (1986), contains the participation of singer Ivete Sangalo in re-recording her song "Festa". The song "Parabéns da Xuxa" was released only on the CD, "Tá bom" is included on the CD as a full track (on the DVD, there are only excerpts from it, in the passages between songs.

a Spanish version was released in 2012.

Release and reception
Xuxa só Para Baixinhos 6 - Festa was released on December 9, 2005 on CD and VHS, together or separately and also on Blu-ray; and was the last album in the collection Só Para Baixinhos to be released in VHS format. It sold more than 100,000 copies in DVD, yielding certification of diamond. This album reached 7th place among the best-selling CDs of the year, and 3rd place among the DVDs.

The Spanish version of Xuxa Festa, the Xuxa Fiesta, has never been released and is scheduled to be released in 2018, Xuxa sang the Spanish versions of "Ilariê" (Ilarié), "Doce Mel" (Dulce Miel), in the Susana Giménez program in 2011; and "Tindolelê" (Chindolele) in the party of 25 years of the Argentine transmitter Telefé in 2015.

Awards
Xuxa Festa was nominated to the Best Latin Children's Album in the 7th Annual Latin Grammy Awards in 2007.

Tour
Xuxa Festa was the fourteenth tour of the presenter and singer Xuxa Meneghel, the tour is based on the album Só Para Baixinhos 6: Xuxa Festa. The tour began on October 21, 2005 at the Rio de Janeiro launch show. The tour toured the cities of Brasília, São Paulo and Luanda, Angola (being the only XSPB tour to have an international show, this show was broadcast live). It was released in 2008 the official record of the tour, being the third tour of Xuxa to have a record.

Track listing

Personnel
General direction: Xuxa Meneghel
Production: Luiz Claudio Moreira e Mônica Muniz
Art Direction: Gringo Cardia
Animation Direction: Marcos Magalhães
Assistant director: Ana Paula Guimarães (Catu)
Production Director: Junior Porto
Musical Direction: Ary Sperling
Musical Coordination: Vanessa Alves
DVD Direction: Brent Hieatt
Graphic project: Felipe Gois

Certifications

References

External links 
 Xuxa só para Baixinhos 6 at Discogs

2005 albums
2005 video albums
Xuxa albums
Xuxa video albums
Children's music albums by Brazilian artists
Portuguese-language video albums
Portuguese-language albums
Som Livre albums